Sarahs District (Turkmen: Sarahs etraby, Russian Cyrillic Серахский этрап) is a district of Ahal Province, Turkmenistan. Its capital is the city of Sarahs (called in the Soviet period Serakhs).

References

Districts of Turkmenistan
Ahal Region